Polemonium acutiflorum, known as tall Jacob's-ladder, is a flowering plant in the family Polemoniaceae. It is native to western Canada and Alaska.

References

acutiflorum
Flora of North America